Alex Joffé (18 November 1918 – 18 August 1995) was a French film director and screenwriter, known for Les cracks (1968), Fortunat (1960) and La grosse caisse (1965). He was the father of the director Arthur Joffé, as well as Marion (born 1952) and Nina (born 1956).

Alex Joffé was born on 18 November 1918 in Alexandria, Egypt, as Alexandre Joffé. He was married to Renée Asseo. on his mother's side, he is related to author and journalist Salomon Malka, the biographer of Emmanuel Lévinas and Franz Rosenzweig, and theatre professor, director and playwright Avraham Oz. He died on 18 August 1995 in Paris.

Filmography

Director 
 1946 : Six heures à perdre starring André Luguet and Denise Grey
 1953 : Open Letter starring Robert Lamoureux and Geneviève Page
 1955 : Les Hussards starring Bourvil, Bernard Blier, Louis de Funès and Georges Wilson
 1956 : Les Assassins du dimanche starring Barbara Laage, Dominique Wilms and Jean-Marc Thibault
 1957 : A Bomb for a Dictator starring Pierre Fresnay and Michel Auclair
 1959 : Du rififi chez les femmes starring Robert Hossein, Roger Hanin and Silvia Monfort
 1960 : Fortunat starring Bourvil et Michèle Morgan
 1961 : Le Tracassin ou Les Plaisirs de la ville starring Bourvil and Pierrette Bruno
 1962 : Les Culottes rouges starring Bourvil and Laurent Terzieff
 1965 : Pas question le samedi starring Robert Hirsch
 1965 : La Grosse Caisse starring Bourvil and Paul Meurisse
 1968 : Les Cracks starring Bourvil, Robert Hirsch and Monique Tarbès

Screenwriter 
 1943 : Ne le criez pas sur les toits
 1944 : Florence est folle
 1946 : Adieu chérie (released in English as Goodbye Darling)
 1946 : Tant que je vivrai
 1946 : Christine se marie
 1946 : La Fille du diable
 1946 : L'assassin n'est pas coupable (released in English as The Murderer is Not Guilty)
 1947 : Six heures à perdre
 1948 : El supersabio (released in English as The Genius)
 1949 : El Mago (released in English as Magician)
 1949 : Millionaires for One Day 
 1950 : Le 84 prend des vacances
 1950 : Trois Télégrammes
 1951 : Monte Carlo Baby
 1951 : ...Sans laisser d'adresse (released in English as Without Leaving an Address)
 1951 : Alone in Paris
 1951 : Nous irons à Monte-Carlo (French version of Monte Carlo Baby)
 1953 : Taxi
 1953 : Lettre ouverte
 1953 : Women of Paris
 1954 : L'Aventurier de Séville
 1955 : Les Hussards
 1956 : Les Assassins du dimanche
 1956 : I'll Get Back to Kandara
 1957 : Les Fanatiques
 1959 : Du rififi chez les femmes
 1960 : Fortunat
 1961 : Le Tracassin ou Les Plaisirs de la ville
 1962 : Les Culottes rouges
 1965 : Pas question le samedi
 1965 : La Grosse Caisse
 1968 : Les Cracks

Actor 
 1957 : Amour de poche (directed by Pierre Kast)
 1960 : Tirez sur le pianiste (directed by François Truffaut)
 1986 : Hôtel du Paradis (directed by Jana Boková)

References

External links 
 
 Alex Joffé at Les gens du cinéma web site 

French film directors
French male screenwriters
20th-century French screenwriters
1918 births
1995 deaths
People from Alexandria
20th-century French male writers
Egyptian emigrants to France